Julie Scott S.R.C (born August 24, 1958) is the only known and documented female  Rosicrucian Grandmaster. She is the Grand Master of the English Grand Lodge for the Americas, a position she has held since 2000. She is also the secretary for the board of directors of the Supreme Grand Lodge of Ancient Mystical Order Rosae Crucis.

References 

1958 births
Living people
21st-century occultists
American occultists